Rio Meão is a Portuguese parish, located in the municipality of Santa Maria da Feira. The population in 2011 was 4,931, in an area of 6.68 km2.

History

The parish was first mentioned in the 8th century (773) as "Rius Medianus".  The name of the parish comes from a small river south of the parish ("Rius Medianus") and is located between Santa Maria da Feira and Paços de Brandão. In 1220, it became a parish.

Sancho I received the parish, the Ordem do Hospitel, it later reorganized into a settlement of the Portuguese territory.

Sites of interest

The parishes contains three historic traditional houses:

Casa dos Brandões de Tabuaça de Anta
Casa do Mourão
Casa da Peredinha

Sporting club

Juventude Atlética de Rio Meão - football

References

External links 
 Rio Meão blog 
 Santa Maria da Feira Municipal Chamber 

Freguesias of Santa Maria da Feira